Human Powered Health is a UCI ProTeam cycling team, based in the United States. The team has been directed by Jonas Carney since its inception. Notable riders who have previously ridden for the team include Ben King, Chad Haga, Carter Jones, Phil Gaimon, Michael Woods, David Veilleux, Matthew Busche, Ryan Anderson, Mike Creed, Mike Friedman and Sepp Kuss.

Team roster

Major wins

2009
  Overall Vuelta del Uruguay, Scott Zwizanski
Stages 1, 3 & 4, Jake Keough
Stage 2, Jonathan Reid Mumford
Stage 7, Scott Zwizanski
  Overall Tour of Thailand, Andrew Bajadali
Stage 5, Andrew Bajadali
  Overall Tour de Beauce, Scott Zwizanski
2010
 Overall Festningsrittet, Jesse Anthony
2011
 Stage 2 Tour of Utah, Jesse Anthony
2012
 Stages 1, 5, 6 & 10 Vuelta del Uruguay, Ken Hanson
 Tour de Korea
Stage 2, Alex Candelario
Stages 7 & 8, Ken Hanson
 Tour of Elk Grove
Prologue, Tom Zirbel
Stages 1 & 2, Ken Hanson
 Gooikse Pijl, Ken Hanson
2013
 Volta ao Alentejo
Stage 3, Ken Hanson
Stage 4, Tom Zirbel
 Stage 3 Tour of the Gila, Tom Zirbel
  National Time Trial Championships, Tom Zirbel
 Stages 2 & 4 Tour de Korea, Eric Young
  National Criterium Championships, Eric Young
 Stage 1 Tour of Elk Grove, Chad Haga
2014
 Stage 6 Vuelta Mexico Telmex, Eric Young
 Stage 2 Redlands Bicycle Classic, Tom Zirbel
 Tour of the Battenkill, Scott Zwizanski
 Stage 4 Joe Martin Stage Race, Brad Huff
  Overall Tour of the Gila, Carter Jones
 Stage 4 Tour of California, Will Routley
 Stages 1 & 2 Grand Prix Cycliste de Saguenay, Eric Young
  Overall Nature Valley Grand Prix, Ryan Anderson
Stage 1a, Tom Zirbel
Stage 2, Ryan Anderson
 Delta International Road Race, Jesse Anthony
Prologue Cascade Cycling Classic, Tom Zirbel
 Stage 5 Tour of Utah, Eric Young
2015
 Clássica Loulé, Michael Woods
  Overall Redlands Bicycle Classic, Phil Gaimon
Stage 2 (ITT), Tom Zirbel
Stage 3, Phil Gaimon
 Stage 2 GP Internacional do Guadiana, Ryan Anderson
 Tour of the Gila
Stage 2, Eric Young
Stage 3 (ITT), Tom Zirbel
Stage 5, Michael Woods
 Stage 3 Grand Prix Cycliste de Saguenay, Pierrick Naud
 Stage 3b Tour de Beauce, Guillaume Boivin
  National Road Race Championships, Guillaume Boivin
 White Spot / Delta Road Race, Eric Young
 Tour of Utah
Stage 4, Eric Young
Stage 5, Michael Woods
2016
 Prologue Istrian Spring Trophy, Eric Young
 Stage 2 GP Liberty Seguros, Will Routley
 Stage 3 Tour of the Gila, Tom Zirbel
 Stage 4 Grand Prix Cycliste de Saguenay, Eric Young
 Stage 2 Tour de Beauce, Sepp Kuss
 Gastown Grand Prix, Eric Young 
 Prologue Tour Alsace, Curtis White
 Stage 3 Tour of Alberta, Evan Huffman
2017
 Joe Martin Stage Race
Stage 1 (ITT), Adam de Vos
Stage 3, Eric Young
  Overall Tour of the Gila, Evan Huffman
Stage 1 Matteo Dal-Cin
Stages 2 & 4 Eric Young
Stage 3 (ITT), Evan Huffman
 Stages 4 & 7 Tour of California, Evan Huffman
 Tour de Beauce
Stage 2, Matteo Dal-Cin
Stage 5, Rob Britton
  National Road Race Championships, Matteo Dal-Cin
  National U23 Time Trial Championships, Brandon McNulty
 Gastown Grand Prix, Eric Young
 Cascade Cycling Classic
Stage 2 (ITT), Evan Huffman
Stage 4, Shane Kline
  Overall Tour of Utah, Rob Britton
Stage 3 (ITT), Rob Britton
  Overall Tour of Alberta, Evan Huffman
Stage 1, Evan Huffman
2018
 Stage 3 Tour de Langkawi, Adam de Vos
  Overall Tour of the Gila, Rob Britton
 White Spot / Delta Road Race, Adam de Vos
 Gastown Grand Prix, Eric Young 
 Stage 2 Arctic Race of Norway, Colin Joyce
2019
  Overall Giro di Sicilia, Brandon McNulty
Stage 3, Brandon McNulty
 Rutland–Melton CiCLE Classic, Colin Joyce
 Stages 2, 3 & 4 Grand Prix Cycliste de Saguenay, Pier-André Côté
  National Time Trial Championships, Rob Britton
  National Road Race Championships, Adam de Vos
2020
 Stages 4 & 5 Tour de Savoie Mont-Blanc, Gavin Mannion
2021
 Stage 1 Presidential Tour of Turkey, Arvid de Kleijn
  National Road Race Championships, Joey Rosskopf
 Volta a Portugal
Stages 2 & 8, Kyle Murphy
Stage 6, Ben King
 Stage 4 Danmark Rundt, Colin Joyce
 Stage 2 Tour of Britain, Robin Carpenter
 Route Adélie, Arvid de Kleijn
2022
 Grand Prix Criquielion, Pier-André Côté
 Stage 1 Four Days of Dunkirk, Arvid de Kleijn
  National Road Race Championships, Pier-André Côté
  National Road Race Championships, Kyle Murphy

Supplementary statistics
Sources

National champions
2013
  United States Time trial Champion, Tom Zirbel
  United States Criterium Champion, Eric Young
2015
  Canadian Road race Champion, Guillaume Boivin
2017
  Canadian Road race Champion, Matteo Dal-Cin
  United States Under-23 Time trial Champion, Brandon McNulty
2019
  Canadian Road race Champion, Adam de Vos
  Canadian Time trial Champion, Rob Britton
2021
  United States Road race Champion, Joey Rosskopf

References

External links
 

Cycling teams based in the United States
UCI Professional Continental teams
Cycling teams established in 2008
2008 establishments in the United States